Braian Ezequiel Maidana Talavera (born 22 July 1999) is an Argentine professional footballer who plays as a winger for Deportivo Santamarina, on loan from Huracán.

Career
Maidana is a product of the Huracán youth system. He signed his first professional contract in November 2017. Maidana was promoted into interim manager Néstor Apuzzo's first-team squad in December 2019 for a Primera División encounter with Arsenal de Sarandí, with the winger subsequently making his senior debut during a 2–0 home defeat; he replaced Agustín Curruhinca with nine minutes remaining at the Estadio Tomás Adolfo Ducó. In February 2020, he renewed his contract until June 2023. His second appearance arrived in the Copa de la Liga Profesional on 10 January 2021, again against Arsenal; in an away loss.

At the end of July 2021, Maidana joined Primera Nacional club Deportivo Santamarina on loan until the end of 2022.

Career statistics
.

Notes

References

External links

1999 births
Living people
People from La Matanza Partido
Argentine footballers
Association football forwards
Argentine Primera División players
Primera Nacional players
Club Atlético Huracán footballers
Sportspeople from Buenos Aires Province